Anton Viktorovich Fokin (born November 13, 1982) is an Uzbek artistic gymnast who represented Uzbekistan at the 2008 Summer Olympics, where he won a bronze medal on the parallel bars. He also won the bronze medal on the parallel bars at the 2007 World Artistic Gymnastics Championships.

References

External links
 International Gymnast profile

1982 births
Living people
Uzbekistani male artistic gymnasts
Sportspeople from Tashkent
Gymnasts at the 2008 Summer Olympics
Gymnasts at the 2016 Summer Olympics
Olympic gymnasts of Uzbekistan
Olympic bronze medalists for Uzbekistan
Medalists at the World Artistic Gymnastics Championships
Olympic medalists in gymnastics
Medalists at the 2008 Summer Olympics
Asian Games medalists in gymnastics
Gymnasts at the 2002 Asian Games
Gymnasts at the 2006 Asian Games
Gymnasts at the 2010 Asian Games
Gymnasts at the 2014 Asian Games
Gymnasts at the 2018 Asian Games
Asian Games silver medalists for Uzbekistan
Medalists at the 2014 Asian Games
Medalists at the 2010 Asian Games
21st-century Uzbekistani people